Spizixos is a genus of passerine birds in the bulbul family Pycnonotidae.

Taxonomy
The genus Spizixos was introduced in 1845 by the English zoologist Edward Blyth to accommodate the crested finchbill. The word Spizixos  combines the Ancient Greek spiza  meaning "finch" with the genus name Ixos that was introduced by Coenraad Jacob Temminck in 1825.

The genus contains two species:
 Crested finchbill (Spizixos canifrons)
 Collared finchbill (Spizixos semitorques)

References

 
Bird genera
Taxa named by Edward Blyth
Taxonomy articles created by Polbot